In mathematics, a unit vector in a normed vector space is a vector (often a spatial vector) of length 1.

The term direction vector, commonly denoted as d, is used to describe a unit vector being used to represent spatial direction and relative direction. 2D spatial directions are numerically equivalent to points on the unit circle 
and spatial directions in 3D are equivalent to a point on the unit sphere.

The normalized vector û of a non-zero vector u is the unit vector in the direction of u, i.e.,

where ‖u‖ is the norm (or length) of u. The term normalized vector is sometimes used as a synonym for unit vector.

Unit vectors are often chosen to form the basis of a vector space, and every vector in the space may be written as a linear combination of unit vectors.

Orthogonal coordinates

Cartesian coordinates

Unit vectors may be used to represent the axes of a Cartesian coordinate system. For instance, the standard unit vectors in the direction of the x, y, and z axes of a three dimensional Cartesian coordinate system are

They form a set of mutually orthogonal unit vectors, typically referred to as a standard basis in linear algebra.

They are often denoted using common vector notation (e.g., i or ) rather than standard unit vector notation (e.g.).

When a unit vector in space is expressed in Cartesian notation as a linear combination of i, j, k, its three scalar components can be referred to as direction cosines. The value of each component is equal to the cosine of the angle formed by the unit vector with the respective basis vector. This is one of the methods used to describe the orientation (angular position) of a straight line, segment of straight line, oriented axis, or segment of oriented axis (vector).

Cylindrical coordinates

The three orthogonal unit vectors appropriate to cylindrical symmetry are: 
  (also designated  or ), representing the direction along which the distance of the point from the axis of symmetry is measured; 
 , representing the direction of the motion that would be observed if the point were rotating counterclockwise about the symmetry axis;
 , representing the direction of the symmetry axis; 

When differentiating or integrating in cylindrical coordinates, these unit vectors themselves must also be operated on.

Spherical coordinates

To minimize redundancy of representations, the polar angle  is usually taken to lie between zero and 180 degrees. Here, the American "physics" convention is used. This leaves the azimuthal angle  defined the same as in cylindrical coordinates. The Cartesian relations are:

For a more complete description, see Jacobian matrix and determinant. The non-zero derivatives are:

General unit vectors

Common themes of unit vectors occur throughout physics and geometry:

Curvilinear coordinates
In general, a coordinate system may be uniquely specified using a number of linearly independent unit vectors  (the actual number being equal to the degrees of freedom of the space). For ordinary 3-space, these vectors may be denoted . It is nearly always convenient to define the system to be orthonormal and right-handed:

Right versor
In fact, he was the originator of the term vector, as every quaternion  has a scalar part s and a vector part v. Thus by Euler's formula,  is a versor in the 3-sphere.

See also

Cartesian coordinate system
Coordinate system
Curvilinear coordinates
Four-velocity
Jacobian matrix and determinant
Normal vector
Polar coordinate system
Standard basis
Unit interval
 Unit square, cube, circle, sphere, and hyperbola
 Vector notation
Vector of ones
Unit matrix

Notes

References

Linear algebra
Elementary mathematics
1 (number)
Vectors (mathematics and physics)